Burhânettin Deran (b. Ottoman Empire, 1902 - d. Istanbul, Turkey, on 9 March 1965) was a Turkish composer and qanun performer. He is the father of painter Erol Deran. Born in 1902, he died on 9 March 1965, and is buried in the Kozlu Cemetery in Istanbul.

See also 
 List of composers of classical Turkish music

References

Composers of Ottoman classical music
Composers of Turkish makam music
1902 births
1965 deaths
20th-century composers